"Flytta på dej!" (which translates as "Move over") is a single by Swedish pop singer Alina Devecerski. The song was co-written by Devecerski and Christoffer Wikberg. It was released as a digital download on 20 April 2012 and peaked at number one in Sweden, Norway and Denmark.

Track listing

Charts

Weekly charts

Year-end charts

Release history

References

2012 singles
Swedish-language songs
Number-one singles in Denmark
Number-one singles in Norway
Number-one singles in Sweden
2012 songs
EMI Records singles